Blindfold (Ruth Aldine) is a fictional character, a mutant appearing in American comic books published by Marvel Comics. The character is usually depicted as a member of the student body of the Xavier Institute in X-Men-related comic books. She first appeared in Astonishing X-Men, vol. 3 #7 and was created by Joss Whedon and John Cassaday.

Fictional character biography
Blindfold is a student at the Xavier Institute and ever since she was a child, Ruth had worn a blindfold to cover up her obvious mutation and it was this that inspired her new codename "Blindfold." She was first mentioned by Hisako Ichiki and Wing before their confrontation with Ord. Hisako and Wing both said she had a big mouth because she had read Wing's mind and informed Hisako of his dreams of one day becoming an X-Man. Wing was upset, but Hisako told him not to worry, as she wanted to be an X-Man too, and that Blindfold was just lonely. Whether it was her fractured psyche or the fact that her powers were not suited for battle, Ruth tended to stay out of limelight.

Decimation
Ruth was one of the few mutants to retain their powers and she remained at the school after the Decimation on M-Day, although Ms. Frost excused her from combat training.

Danger
When she foresaw her friend Wing die and the robotic entity Danger being created because of it, Ruth alerted the X-Men, nevertheless her premonition eventually came to pass when a depressed Wing is shown near the edge of a cliff, lamenting over the loss of his powers when suddenly Hisako appears behind him, first to give him comfort, but then chides him to jump off, which he does falling to his death. However, the setting around him and Hisako suddenly dissipate to reveal that it was all a holographic scenario created by the now sentient and hostile Danger Room, and Wing being the robotic's first fatal victim.

Torn
When Emma Frost was struggling with survivor's guilt, Blindfold was found by Hisako "crying" in a restroom. While Hisako comforts her, Blindfold tries to convince Hisako that they are going to lose another X-Man. Wolverine, believing he is a defenseless child due to the manipulations of Cassandra Nova, barged into the restroom asking for help as a feral Beast followed him in. Hisako leaves Blindfold and hides with Wolverine, unfortunately Beast targets Blindfold and goes to attack her. Hisako powers up and scares the feral X-Man away but passes out from exhaustion. Blindfold then takes her to the infirmary because she believes someone was awake only to find the unconscious bodies of Colossus and Cyclops. Eventually Shadowcat makes her way back to the Institute and asks the girls to tell her everything they know. When Kitty leaves to find out who exactly is attacking, Cyclops manages to contact Blindfold and instruct her to give Beast a special box containing a ball of string. He also asks her to keep his mind safe from any sort of psychic attacks as he helps Emma. During the middle of the battle, Ord and the Danger Room entity interrupt and a battle begins between the X-Men, Hisako, Ord and Danger. Suddenly S.W.O.R.D. beamed the team, Danger, Ord, and Hisako into a spaceship headed for the Breakworld. Blindfold was last seen watching them along with a few other students and again commented that not all of them will come back, referring to Shadowcat who would be lost in space for a long time.

Quest for Magik
Blindfold, during an evening of storytelling, relayed the history of the deceased New Mutant Illyana Rasputin to her classmates. Her story emotionally bothered some of them as Blindfold began including aspects that both recently happened and were about to happen. She explained that the demon lord Belasco reclaimed the realm of Limbo by defeating its previous mistress, Amanda Sefton. Belasco cast her out of Limbo and began searching for a way to bring back Illyana Rasputin from the dead. After saying this, Blindfold and the other students were themselves attacked by demons from Limbo sent by Belasco. She continued to assist the students with advice throughout their time in Limbo, telling certain students when and how to react to their situations, especially concerning Pixie, who she declared "must not fall". She survived the final battle and was returned to the mansion with the rest of the students.

Blinded by the Light
Cannonball is given knowledge of the plans of the Marauders and implies that Blindfold is second on a targets list for elimination by them and the Acolytes, orchestrated by Mr. Sinister. Blindfold speaks to the New X-Men saying that whatever is supposed to happen to her can be prevented by Elixir. She grabs his hands, touching the black part of his skin that represents death and the gold part that represents life at the same time. A large energy transfer of black and gold follows, and she is incapacitated, though the New X-Men are both confused as to what she meant and unsure of whether she is dead or merely unconscious. Right as Pixie goes to get help from Shadowcat, the institute is attacked by Exodus and his Acolytes. After examining her, Exodus states that Blindfold is dead and she is no longer a priority to them and they continue on to look for Destiny's Diaries in the mansion, but in spite of this she does not 'smell dead' to X-23, and Prodigy theorizes that Blindfold's precognitive abilities forewarned her of Exodus' coming and so she used Elixir's powers to put herself in a deathlike sleep. Shadowcat subsequently operates on Blindfold, who finally awakens to speak further cryptic predictions about the X-Men's challenging situation, saying that soon Hellion, Pixie, Nightcrawler and someone else she cannot recall will be hurt.

Messiah Complex
Her predictions were soon proven correct when Lady Deathstrike maims Hellion, Scalphunter seriously injures Nightcrawler and Pixie injures herself by blindly teleporting the team from the Reavers. The other person Blindfold mentions was apparently Forge, who was injured by Bishop; or perhaps Professor X.

Young X-Men
Blindfold has a nightmare in which one of her future teammates, the Young X-Men, is killed by Donald Pierce. She meets up with Rockslide and tells him of her premonition of the soon-to-be-formed team and mentions the death of one of their future teammates, though Santo appears to take little heed of it, being more interested in the team uniforms she saw.  As predicted, Cyclops arrives at the cafe and offers Santo a place on the team, but also revealing that he did not wish to recruit Ruth. However, Santo refuses to join the team unless she is allowed to as well, noting that Ruth's vision included her on the squad as well. Cyclops concedes, and Ruth takes her place on the squad.

Cyclops orders Ruth and Ink to bring in Dani Moonstar, who is apparently a member of a new Brotherhood of Mutants. However Ink betrays Ruth and delivers both girls to Donald Pierce, who is revealed to be impersonating Cyclops. Eventually they are freed and Ruths prediction comes to pass and Wolf Cub is killed. She then relocates to San Francisco with the rest of the Young X-Men, but leaves the team. Cyclops states that Ruth will only be called in as needed.<ref>Young X-Men #6</ref>

When Cipher reveals her presence to the Young X-Men, Cyclops explains that she had been there in secret under his orders helping the Young X-Men and much earlier, including during Beast's attack on Blindfold during Astonishing X-Men. Blindfold's seemingly one-sided conversation during that time (and others) is revealed to have actually been a conversation between herself and Cipher, who was able to mask her part of the conversation using her stealth powers. Blindfold is the only other besides Jean Grey, Cyclops, and Graymalkin who were aware of Cipher's existence prior to the events of Young X-Men. The two developed a friendship during this time.

Necrosha
Blindfold is shown battling the resurrected Tower without the aid of any other X-Men.

Blindfold is contacted by the newly resurrected Destiny by accident when she was trying to reach her foster daughter Rogue. Destiny saves her life from being crushed by falling rubble and gives her some information to help combat Selene's forces. After Destiny breaks contact with her, she believes she made a grave mistake. This mistake is revealed to be that Ruth is possessed by Proteus.

Blindfold is eventually freed thanks to Magneto who uses his powers to disrupt Proteus' energy matrix. During a conversation with Destiny, it is revealed that she and Destiny are distant relatives and that Ruth's mother had sacrificed herself to save Ruth from her brother, for what reason has yet to be revealed.

Age of X
Blindfold later confides in Rogue that she had visions of an entity, a mysterious force that wanted to change everything, and once it started it would not stop until everything had been destroyed. However, she cannot identify what it is because it keeps hiding around the periphery of her visions. Rogue, along with Madison Jeffries, eventually find a squid-like spider-monster that had escaped from Emplate's dimension, which they think to be the entity Blindfold sensed. However, after Rogue defeats the creature, Blindfold reveals that the threat is still out there. Before anyone could say anything else, darkness descended over Utopia and the real threat emerged.

The world around Blindfold changed dramatically and Blindfold is next seen in the jail of Fortress X during the "Age of X" storyline. She is one of the mutants considered too dangerous to roam free and is under Danger's supervision. She seems to be the Earth-616 version of the character and the only person seen so far with any memory of the mainstream reality.

Schism
When Cyclops and Wolverine had a difference of opinion as to how to lead the X-Men, Wolverine left Utopia and set up the Jean Grey School for Higher Learning back in Westchester. Many of the students, including Blindfold, chose to leave Cyclops’ militaristic style leadership and go back to being just school students with Wolverine. Before she left, though, Ruth had one final task asked of her. Recently a group of X-Men had come back from space and it seemed they had brought an unseen stowaway with them. When the other X-Men couldn't figure the situation out, it was suggested Blindfold might be able to help, given that she viewed the world differently. As it turns out, they were right and she correctly identified that the Shi'ar named Korvus’ sword was actually a gateway and someone was trapped on the other side. The X-Men made a successful rescue mission and Blindfold travelled to Westchester to be with the other students.X-Men Legacy #259-260

Regenesis
Much like Utopia, the Jean Grey School seemed to be a beacon for trouble and Blindfold foresaw many of the threats coming. She had visions of a man bringing great destruction to the X-Men and so when Exodus showed up on the doorstep everybody assumed that it was him. With Exodus dealt with, things calmed down for a bit but Blindfold realized that it wasn't him that her premonitions were warning her about.

Avengers vs. X-Men
The real threat came when Cyclops was possessed by the Phoenix Force. When Professor X tried to help him, the possessed Cyclops ended up killing his former teacher.

Blindfold's history unfolds
The psychic backlash was more than Blindfold could stand and she doubled over in pain as all her premonitions were now in flux. Ruth wasn't the only one to be affected by Xavier's death as his son David, aka Legion, also had a monumental breakdown. Ruth didn't know what had caused the changing futures but she could see that a mountain retreat in Tibet would hold some of the answers. A team of X-Men travelled to Tibet and found the retreat, but they discovered dozens of bodies littering the landscape. They quickly realized that David had caused it and Blindfold could now feel him and how scared he was. They set off after him but, as they continued along his trail, they kept on finding more bodies of the people who got in his way. None of them realized David was not only battling the forces of his multiple personalities but also that of a mysterious force that existed as a pair of disembodied eyeballs.

The team of X-Men eventually caught up with Legion in Japan and, mistakenly believing he was about to harm some children, attacked. Ruth stayed back from the fight but her mind was clearing up now and she could see David for what he was. When he overwhelmed the X-Men, Ruth realized that she was the answer to calming him down, so she entered his mind to talk. Inside David's mind, Ruth found she could speak perfectly without her usual speech mannerisms. She also wielded immense power over most of the personalities in Legion's mind, calming them all down so she and David could talk undisturbed. Ruth introduced herself, kissed David on the lips and then told him she was supposed to be his nemesis. She tried to explain that everything was going to be alright and he should trust her, but she was caught off guard by one of David's personalities. This one remained unaffected by her influence and it angrily slashed her throat and forced her out of David's mind. In the real world, Blindfold collapsed and had to be rushed back to the school.

David was transfixed by this girl who had sauntered into his mind and kissed him without any trouble. David travelled to the Jean Grey School and used astral projection to check up on her, finding Blindfold in the medical bay in a coma. Deciding to find out more about her, David delved into her mind and discovered her tragic history for himself. When Ruth Aldine was born, it became immediately obvious she wasn't like other children. She was clearly a mutant and the X-gene had caused her to be born without eyes. Having a child with an obvious mutation put a strain on her parents’ marriage and, after a few weeks, Ruth's father walked and never came back. Her mother had to work long hours to be able to feed the family and so she would often leave Ruth in the care of her older brother, Luca. Seeing his father walk out because of Ruth caused Luca to build up a deep resentment of his sister. As she grew up, Ruth started to display other powers, which caused even more stress on the family. Luca's resentment towards Ruth caused him to begin physically lashing out at her. When he was in his teens, Luca became self-destructive and was soon sent to rehab for his drug addiction. While there, he latched onto sermons by a bigoted priest and started hating mutants even more. Though Luca was released as drug-free, his problems weren't solved and he continued his abuse of his sister and his mother. Luca finally snapped and attempted to kill his sister with a chainsaw, but their mother intervened and died protecting Ruth from her brother. The years of abuse and violence had caused Ruth to see herself as the problem, so when Luca blamed her for making him kill their mother, she believed him. Luca was caught by the authorities and not only convicted of his crime but was sentenced to death. Ruth went to live with her aunt and the few years that followed were the happiest of her life. There, she could use her various gifts without feeling persecuted by anyone. By the time she was in her early teens, it was time for Luca's execution. Regardless of all the things he had put her through, Ruth felt she needed to be there as he died. She used her telepathy and gained access to the execution. However, as Luca was given the lethal injection, his own gifts emerged and his "spirit" left his body and attacked Ruth, stealing half her powers. After that day, Ruth was unable to talk in a clear and definitive way. She would always add words like "please, thank you, yes, no and sorry" into regular sentences, as if she had a form of Tourette's. In fact, it wasn't just her speech patterns that had changed; her entire psyche had fractured and Ruth found it hard to piece back together again. Thanks to her gifts, Ruth also had trouble separating the past, present, and future into their proper order, since she perceived all three at once. Ruth's aunt eventually received a call from the Xavier Institute and so Ruth was sent to a school where she could harness her gifts. David could feel Ruth's psyche hiding somewhere within her memories but he couldn't reach her before the personality that had originally harmed Ruth stopped him.

As Ruth lay in the coma, one of the young children David had saved in Japan entered the room and attacked the doctor looking after her. As it turned out, the young boy was possessed by Luca, Ruth's not-so-dead brother, and he had been orchestrating events so he could get closer to her to kill her. He had been the strange disembodied eyeballs that had followed David around, helping him escape the X-Men. Apparently, when he stole some of Ruth's powers, he also gained some precognition of his own and he was hoping to use it to rid the world of mutants, as he blamed them for all his problems. Firstly though, he wanted to kill the mutant who started everything off and so, sitting on top of Blindfold, he prepared to stab her with a kitchen knife. Before he could kill her though, he was stopped by David. The two fought and the X-Men were soon alerted to the brawl as it spilled out onto the back lawn. Luca, pretending to be the young boy, manipulated the X-Men into believing David was harming him. Unfortunately for him, Blindfold had woken up from her coma with all her memories intact and she raced outside and stabbed the young boy with the kitchen knife. Luca's energy exploded out of him and vanished, leaving the husk of the young boy, who had apparently died a long time before. Ruth vouched for David's innocence and, as he left, she warned him that something dark was coming.

Tragic Love Story
Even after everything that had happened, Blindfold still couldn't get David out of her mind. Using astral projection, she decided to spy on him and found him at a strange religious cult called the Church of the Happy Host. When the church leaders gave David a pill to see whether or not he was a mutant, Blindfold managed to dispose of the pill without anyone knowing. Blindfold soon realized that the cult was actually the one that had corrupted her brother years ago and was furious with David for being there. When he soon let on that he knew she was watching, she told him off for meddling in things he shouldn't. As he was explaining his intentions, though, he let slip that he considered the meeting a date and Blindfold started blushing. When he was called away by the church leader, she gave him a peck on the cheek and continued to watch over him. David managed to work events so that the church goers were arrested by SWORD for supposed crimes that David committed. As they were taken away, Ruth thanked David for dishing out some justice on the hateful group. Ruth left too but not before she made it clear to David she would be interested in seeing him again. Without Ruth realizing, though, David managed to get his hands on a diary full of prophesies that Luca had written and left at the church.

On their second date, Ruth and David met on the psychosphere, the dreamworld version of the astral plane. From there the two young lovers watched as David used his influence to help a young boy with his powers. Whilst at first they had slightly differing opinions on how he should help the boy, David ultimately came around to Blindfold's way of thinking. Before they could get too cozy, though, Blindfold was forcibly removed from the psychosphere by the same entity that had pushed her out of David's mind a few weeks earlier.

On their next date, the two actually met in person but the venue ended up being just as strange, as David teleported them both to the Moon. David began telling Ruth the story of Aarkus, an ancient cosmic being of which he had seen visions and which was destined to wipe out all mutants. Blindfold was alarmed and told David they should alert the X-Men, but became unsure after he showed her images of Aarkus destroying any team that challenged him. When David promised Ruth that he would take care of Aarkus, Ruth realized he essentially wanted permission to attack the being and was adamant that the being shouldn't be punished for a crime it had yet to commit. To her surprise, David replied he wanted approval because he had already done it five hours earlier. He showed her Aarkus's base on the Moon and revealed he had tampered with the being's mind whilst he was asleep. Ruth was furious but David remained unapologetic. Instead, he sent her back to the school with Aarkus in the hopes the X-Men would educate him.

Despite David's actions, Ruth couldn't stop thinking about him and so she used Cerebra to spy on him without his knowledge. As well as accidentally catching him sleeping in the nude, she also discovered Luca's diary, which David had taken a few weeks earlier. When David woke up, he immediately teleported himself away and it took a while for Blindfold to locate him. When she did, she discovered he was at a medical testing center in San Francisco and was signing on to take a cure for his mutation. Blindfold hurriedly put together her own ad-hoc X-Men team and went to rescue David from himself. When she got there, though, she discovered that she was simply a pawn in David's game and he had counted on them coming for him.

As events unfolded, it was revealed the Red Skull was the one creating the cure for mutants and David was there to stop him. After a tense fight, in which David had to give himself over to the dangerous personality in his mind, the Red Skull fled. Afterwards, Ruth and David talked about their relationship and what the future held for them. Both Ruth and David were now well aware of the future that was headed their way. David was somehow going to end up absorbing all the mutants into himself and killing the entire race. The only outcomes either of them could see was that either David would die by Blindfold's hand or every mutant, including Blindfold, would die. Despite all that, David told her that he would continue to fight for a future where they could be together.

David travelled to the UK next and enlisted a group of British mutants into helping him sort out a problem he foresaw arising. Blindfold stayed behind in America but used astral projection to keep tabs on him and was disappointed to see he was using his powers to force the various mutants into working for him.

When David's mother was murdered, he initially lost control again but soon found his focus and decided it was time he met with Cyclops. Blindfold was becoming his emotional support more and more and she spent a great deal of time inside his mind. However, she was also being worried at some of his actions and how he achieved them. When David confronted Cyclops, he immediately started a fight and laid waste to most of the X-Men. Emma Frost and the Stepford Cuckoos proved to be trickier but Ruth surprised Emma, knocking her out with a punch. Ruth likewise pulled an unlikely victory against the Cuckoos after David slyly gave her a power boost. In the end, it was left to David to fight Cyclops alone. However, during the brawl, the two combatants accidentally knocked into a mutant girl whose powers had just manifested. Unable to control them, she started absorbing every living thing around her into one homogenous mass. When Blindfold saw it, she immediately thought that this was going to be the incident that would end either David or her. David was immediately absorbed into the growing mass and he begged Ruth to kill him with Magik's soulsword.

Knowing what would happen if she didn't, Ruth reluctantly picked up the blade and prepared to stab him, only to be stopped when a hand grabbed hers. When she turned around, Ruth saw Luca, now in possession of a body constructed out of metal. Luca had foreseen what was about to happen and was there to make sure it would go exactly the way he wanted it to. Once again, though, David had played everyone for fools and everything had been part of one big plan. He broke free of the mass, stopped Luca from killing Ruth and then destroyed his body once again. Blindfold was confused but David explained he needed to draw Luca out so he decided to make it seem his prophecy was coming true. Everyone was disgusted by his actions but, as the dust was settling, David had another psychic episode and the errant personality that had been plaguing him for so long broke free. It took control of Luca's body and then disappeared, leaving David and his shattered psyche behind.

David was taken away and it was weeks before Blindfold had any idea where he was. She eventually found him on board the SWORD space station where he was undergoing an unconventional form of therapy. By the time he left, he had a new outlook on his situation and a newfound control over his powers.X-Men Legacy vol. 2 #20

When David came back to Earth, Blindfold entered his mind but found a much different landscape than before and an even more different David. He was now absorbing all his personalities into the David Haller one and changing with each new one. Ruth was shocked at how much he had changed and worried that she could see he was continuing down the path that would lead to one of their deaths. She begged him to stop but, despite his confession of love, he told her he couldn't. He gently put her to sleep so she couldn't get in the way and then went to confront his out of control personality.

With the help of the X-Men, David managed to destroy the personality's body that it stole off Luca. With her brother dead once and for all, the powers that were stolen from Ruth returned to her. She woke up from her sleep and, whilst her body raced towards David's location, she managed to astrally project her psyche there first. Taking the name Destiny, she told the X-Men that it was now too late to save David. Her boyfriend tried absorbing the wayward personality into his new form but, as he did so, it triggered a massive change within him and he started to become the thing Blindfold had feared. Unable to stop himself, he started to absorb the consciousness of every mutant around the world into him, all except Ruth.

Her body finally made it to David and, when she arrived, he saw she had become a powerful being in her own right. Manifesting her own sword, she hacked and slashed at David's form to no avail. Eventually, she forced David to allow her to enter his mind one last time so she could see him again. Inside David's mind, the two made love for the first time. However, as soon as it was over, David could no longer hold back the inevitable. The two lovers bid goodbye and Ruth was forced back into her own body again.

Despite her best efforts, Ruth too was on the verge of being consumed by David's power until the young man found the self-confidence he needed to stop it all. With his full array of powers at his disposal, David altered reality itself and removed himself from existence. For a brief moment, everything went blank but then Ruth found herself back in her old body again at Westchester. It was now the day Xavier had died and none of the events of the past few months had happened. No one knew who David was but, when a lone voice called from inside her head, she discovered he had somehow left a fragment of himself inside her mind.

The Last Blindfold Story
After the X-Men disappeared during the confrontation with X-Man, Blindfold is revealed to be one of the few mutants that remains in the country following the advancement of a mutant vaccine, the rise of popular anti-mutant politicians and the growing anti-mutant sentiment. She tracks Cyclops and Wolverine separately and warned them each that great tragedy lies in their futures. Both Wolverine and Cyclops tell Blindfold they believe the X-Men, who are currently presumed dead while trapped in the "Age of X-Man", are still alive, but Blindfold warns them both about their future actions, and says the X-Men will die before disappearing. Due to Blindfold's cryptic words Cyclops feels that there’s more than what she’s letting on so Cyclops asks Jamie Madrox aka Multiple Man to find Blindfold, and he does. Though she is in hiding, Blindfold allows Madrox to tell Cyclops where she is, but by the time he arrives, it is too late, Blindfold had committed suicide, after foreseeing that she had no future. It's her death that motivate Cyclops to attend an anti-mutant rally where he is recognized, causing a potential incident that is quelled by Captain America.

Dawn of X
Ruth's predictions about her own future once again proves correct as she had apparently foresaw the rise of Krakoa as a utopia for most mutants, but because of who she is, she would not be able to take part in it as by Moira's demand, precog mutants are not allowed on Krakoa.

Destiny of X
Due to the precog ban, Legion become more involved in Krakoa, eventually resulting in him and Nightcrawler creating the Legion of X and the Altar, a sanctuary for mutants within Legion's Omega-Level mutant mind. When the precog ban was lifted, Blindfold has also been able to be finally revived. While many people move into Legion's headspace physically, Legion found Blindfold there in psionic form. As she explained to Legion, she was glad to be back but doesn't necessarily want her body. It seems that the limits of her physical form weren't enough to keep up with her true potential. But now, without those "tortured brain cells threading futures," Blindfold was able to glimpse more freely across the universe. Blindfold's powers have been amplified by this new psionic form, and she describes herself as a "watchman" who can see all the possibilities that await the mutants going forward, granting her the chance to watch the Magus (the father to the New Mutant ally Warlock) fall in battle to Nimrod. This defeat had likely embolden and empower Nimrod and Orchis, and could have caught the mutants entirely by surprise if it weren't for the intervention of Blindfold and Legion, giving the Quiet Council the chance to actually respond to the event. Later while back in The Altar she and Legion were approached by a mysterious being called Mother Righteous, she used her powers on Ruth and showed them many possible future's as well as something happening in the present involving a being that resembled Loki. She then offered David a deal for more power in exchange for his worship. He talked it through with Ruth but after she told him she'd love him either way. She demonstrated her new powers when she helped Nightcrawer and Weaponless Zsen look for a fugitive deity in the Astral Plane and when she forced Switch out of David's mind before he destroyed the House of L.

 Characteristics 

 Powers and abilities 
Blindfold was born without eyes, a condition known as anophthalmia. Her blindness is part of her mutation in the sense that she has no eyes, but rather has skin where eyes would normally be. However, in exchange, she is psionic, though the full extent of her abilities is unknown. She has been shown using telepathy and can sometimes psychically sense events when other telepaths apparently did not, such as Belasco pulling everyone inside the mansion into Limbo. She is able to use telepathy has been said to be a clairvoyant, retrocognitive, and precognitive mutant, meaning that she is able to see distant, past, and future places or events. With her level of power, she was immune- albeit to a limited degree- to the reality warp caused by Legion's 'Moira' personality that created the 'Age of X', allowing her to be aware that something was wrong with the world. This goes into full reality anchoring when Legion undid his own birth erasing himself from existence, Ruth was the only individual to remember David even lived after time & space had reset itself when her missing abilities were restored. 

Blindfold's precognitive abilities are neutralized while in the presence of Destiny, another precognitive (and vice versa).  Destiny explains that this is because two precogs in close presence to one another "are like two magnets pressed together positive pole to positive pole" and will negatively affect one another's precognitive abilities and powers.

Ruth also had a slew of other psychic abilities tied to her mutant powers which she had been developing since her early childhood. Possibly boasting an advanced intellect since she had developed a cognitive capacity for vocalization abilities at an early newborn age. Displaying Telekinesis and the ability to read and analyze all possible futures and probabilistic outcomes, but those powers were taken from her by her abusive brother's own ghostly projection which resulted in her impaired mind state. Over time however she has shown remarkable leaps in bounds with her initial ability, similar to Nate Grey, Blindfold can materialize Astral Plane Energy to give her own astral projection a tangible form. With some coaxing from David Haller would showcase herself an adequate match for other powerful telepaths such as the Stepford Cuckoos, and once at the fullest manifest of her powers were returned to her Ruth not only regained her mental stability but also the majority of her missing power. Being able to materialize energy from the Astral Plane as a form of psionic armor enabling her to battle the psionic entity that sprang forth from Legions damaged psyche.

Mannerisms
Blindfold has a unique speech pattern. It includes the odd insertion into her sentences of words of politeness, including "please," "thank you," "you're welcome," and "pardon." She's also been known to oddly insert the words "yes" and "no" into her sentences. The reason she has this pattern is explained in X-Men Legacy when Legion tries to wake her up from her coma: her brother, Luca, was a mutant hater and tried to kill her when she was little, but in a fit of rage, he killed their mother. Years later, Blindfold attended his execution and, just after he died, his astral projection attacked her and stole half of her powers, leaving her "broken". When telepathically projecting herself into Legion's mind in the same issue, Blindfold did not demonstrate this speech pattern, instead speaking in a normal manner and acting with more confidence than is usually the case.

Given that she is both a telepath and a precognitive, she often answers questions before they are asked and responds to comments before they are spoken aloud. As a result, she tends to turn what would ordinarily be a two-way conversation into a monologue. While she does not always do this, it may be assumed that she is allowing the other person or persons to say what she already knows they will say out of politeness' sake.

Some of her "one-sided" conversations in Astonishing X-Men and Young X-Men were explained as having been with her friend Cipher, who remained concealed from all others around them by using her complete stealth mutant powers. After the end of Simon Spurrier's run on X-Men Legacy Ruth had regained her centre of focus now showcasing complete sentences and no more added adjectives between words. Now showcasing her whole and healed persona, Ruth Aldine states to a befuddled Pixie that she's fine and proudly stating "I Rule Me".

 Reception 

 Accolades 

 In 2014, BuzzFeed ranked Blindfold 79th in their "95 X-Men Members Ranked From Worst To Best" list.
 In 2016, CBR.com ranked Blindfold 9th in their "X-Men's Most Mentally Mighty Mutants" list.
 In 2020, Scary Mommy included Blindfold in their "Looking For A Role Model? These 195+ Marvel Female Characters Are Truly Heroic" list.

References

BibliographyAstonishing X-Men, vol. 3 #4, 7–8, 15–18New X-Men, vol. 2 #23New X-Men'', vol. 2 #37–40

Astral projection in popular culture
Comics characters introduced in 2005
Characters created by Joss Whedon
Fictional blind characters
Fictional characters from North Carolina
Fictional characters with precognition
Category:Fictional characters with retrocognition
Marvel Comics characters who have mental powers
Marvel Comics telekinetics
Marvel Comics telepaths
Marvel Comics mutants
Marvel Comics female superheroes